Vrigny may refer to the following places in France:

 Vrigny, Loiret, a commune in the Loiret department
 Vrigny, Marne, a commune in the Marne department
 Vrigny, Orne, a commune in the Orne department